Havlíčkova Borová (until 1949 Borová) is a market town in Havlíčkův Brod District in the Vysočina Region of the Czech Republic. It has about 1,000 inhabitants. It is known as the birthplace of Karel Havlíček Borovský. The historic town centre is well preserved and is protected by law as an urban monument zone.

Administrative parts
Villages of Peršíkov and Železné Horky are administrative parts of Havlíčkova Borová.

Geography
Most of the municipal territory lies in the northern tip of the Křižanov Highlands. Northeastern half of the municipality is situated in the Žďárské vrchy Protected Landscape Area.

History

The first written mention of Borová is from 1289. In 1547, the village was promoted to a market town. During its heyday in the 19th century, a school and many houses were built, there were a lot of entrepreneurs who were able to make Borová self-sufficient, and the market town reached about 1,700 inhabitants.

Sights
The landmark is the Church of Saint Vitus. It was built in the Gothic style in the 15th century.

The historic centre contains houses from the 19th century with Empire style façades.

The birthplace of Karel Havlíček Borovský is a national cultural monument. Since 1931, the house has been used as a museum of his life and work.

Notable people
Karel Havlíček Borovský (1821–1856), writer and poet

References

External links

Populated places in Havlíčkův Brod District
Market towns in the Czech Republic